The 1912 All-Ireland Junior Hurling Championship was the first staging of the All-Ireland Junior Championship, the Gaelic Athletic Association's second tier hurling championship. The championship ended on 23 February 1913.

The All-Ireland final was played on 23 February 1913 at Jones's Road in Dublin, between Cork and Westmeath, in what was their first ever championship meeting. Cork won the match by 3-06 to 2-01 to claim their first championship title.

Results

Leinster Junior Hurling Championship

Leinster quarter-finals

Leinster semi-finals

Leinster final

Munster Junior Hurling Championship

Munster first round

Munster semi-finals

Munster final

All-Ireland Junior Hurling Championship

All-Ireland final

Championship statistics

Miscellaneous

 Cork and Westmeath won their respective provincial championships for the first time in their history.

References

Junior
All-Ireland Junior Hurling Championship